Joni Lehto (born July 15, 1970) is a former professional ice hockey defenceman.

Lehto played for Ottawa 67's in the Ontario Hockey League before being drafted to NHL by New York Islanders. Lehto was part of the Islanders organization for three seasons but never played for the NHL team, playing mostly for their minor league affiliate, the Capital District Islanders in the American Hockey League.

After NHL, Lehto played for Lukko, Ilves, Ässät in Finland, Luleå HF in Sweden and Frankfurt Lions in Germany.

Lehto retired from playing in 1998.

External links
 

1970 births
Living people
Ässät players
Colorado Avalanche scouts
Finnish ice hockey defencemen
Ilves players
Lukko players
Luleå HF players
New York Islanders draft picks
Sportspeople from Turku